Luana Walters (July 22, 1912 – May 19, 1963) was an American motion picture actress from Los Angeles, California.

Biography

Walters was an expert horsewoman, which led to her discovery as an actress at a rodeo in Palm Springs, California. She won a woman's bucking contest which was being watched by a movie scout, who noticed her. 

Her film career began when she visited a friend on a United Artists lot. Douglas Fairbanks, Sr. was excited about her screen possibilities and arranged for a film test. However, only three days later Fairbanks went to Europe, and the test was never completed. Not long afterwards Joe Schenck saw Walters on the dance floor at the Cocoanut Grove in Los Angeles, California. After viewing the abbreviated test made by Fairbanks, Schenck offered her a contract with United Artists. The studio did not make a movie in the next six months so Walters' option was not taken up. 

Walters' screen credits start with an uncredited role in Reaching for the Moon (1930). Her skill as an equestrian helped her in parts in westerns like Ride 'Em Cowboy (1936), Where the West Begins (1938), Mexicali Rose (1939), and Law of the Wolf (1939). On several occasions Walters made films in which her work was left in the cutting room, from the final edit. This began when she made Reaching for the Moon with Fairbanks. Her parts were also deleted from Spawn of the North (1938) and Souls at Sea (1937). The former was a Henry Fonda feature and the latter paired Walters with Robert Cummings.

Walters appeared in "Superman Comes to Earth", the first chapter of the 1948 Superman movie serial starring Kirk Alyn as Superman.  Portions of this depiction appear in flashback in "At the Mercy of Atom Man!", the seventh chapter of the 1950 serial Atom Man vs. Superman. She worked in a number of movie serials and B-Movies, especially in Westerns, featuring her riding skills, and sci-fi or horror genres. She played a female reporter on the trail of a fiend's story in The Corpse Vanishes (1942), with Bela Lugosi. She appears as a cellblock guard in Girls in Prison (1956). Her final role came in The She Creature (1956).

Death
Luana Walters died from effects of alcoholism May 19, 1963 in Los Angeles, California.

Selected filmography

 Reaching for the Moon (1930) - Minor Role (uncredited)
 Two Seconds (1932) - Tart (uncredited)
 Miss Pinkerton (1932) - First Nurse (uncredited)
 End of the Trail (1932) - Luana
 Fighting Texans (1933) - JoAnn Carver
 Secrets of Hollywood (1933) - A Young Actress
 Midshipman Jack (1933) - Gloria (uncredited)
 The Merry Widow (1934) - Maid to Sonia (uncredited)
 The Third Sex (1934) - Elinor Gordon
 Broadway Melody of 1936 (1935) - Showgirl (uncredited)
 The Speed Reporter (1936) - May
 Aces and Eights (1936) - Juanita Hernandez
 Suzy (1936) - Check Room Girl (uncredited)
 Ride 'Em Cowboy (1936) - Lillian Howard
 Shadow of Chinatown (1936, Serial) - Sonya Rokoff, aka The Dragon Lady [Chs. 1-14]
 Under Strange Flags (1937) - Dolores de Vargas
 A Star Is Born (1937) - (uncredited)
 Souls at Sea (1937) - Eloise (uncredited)
 Youth on Parole (1937) - Salesgirl (uncredited)
 The Buccaneer (1938) - Suzette
 Algiers (1938) - Native Waitress (uncredited)
 Where the West Begins (1938) - Lynne Reed
 Assassin of Youth (1938) - Joan Barry
 Marie Antoinette (1938) - Woman in Gaming House (uncredited)
 Thanks for the Memory (1938) - Model (uncredited)
 Say It in French (1938) - Hat Check Girl (uncredited)
 Disbarred (1939) - Office Worker (uncredited)
 Paris Honeymoon (1939) - Angela
 St. Louis Blues (1939) - Dancer (uncredited)
 Cafe Society (1939) - Cigarette Girl (uncredited)
 King of Chinatown (1939) - Nightclub Girl (uncredited)
 I'm from Missouri (1939) - Hat Check Girl (uncredited)
 Mexicali Rose (1939) - Anita Loredo
 Hotel Imperial (1939) - Nurse (uncredited)
 Undercover Doctor (1939) - Nurse (uncredited)
 Law of the Wolf (1939) - Ruth Adams
 The Magnificent Fraud (1939) - Brunette (uncredited)
 Fangs of the Wild (1939) - Carol Dean
 Mutiny on the Blackhawk (1939) - (uncredited)
 Honeymoon in Bali (1939) - Girl Having Her Fortune Told (uncredited)
 Eternally Yours (1939) - Girl at Shower (uncredited)
 Drums of Fu Manchu (1940, Serial) - Mary Randolph
 Millionaire Playboy (1940) - Resort Girl (uncredited)
 The Return of Wild Bill (1940) - Kate Kilgore
 The Durango Kid (1940) - Nancy Winslow
 The Tulsa Kid (1940) - Mary Wallace
 The Range Busters (1940) - Carol Thorp
 Blondie Plays Cupid (1940) - Millie
 Misbehaving Husbands (1940) - Jane Forbes
 The Kid's Last Ride (1941) - Sally Rowell
 Across the Sierras (1941) - Anne Woodworth
 Arizona Bound (1941) - Ruth Masters
 No Greater Sin (1941) - Sandra James
 Road Agent (1941) - Teresa (uncredited)
 The Lone Star Vigilantes (1942)  - Marcia Banning
 Captain Midnight (1942, Serial) - Fury Shark
 Lawless Plainsmen (1942) - Baltimore Bonnie Dixon
 The Corpse Vanishes (1942) - Patricia Hunter
 Inside the Law (1942) - Dora Mason
 Down Texas Way (1942) - Mary Hopkins
 Thundering Hoofs (1942) - Nancy Kellogg
 Bad Men of the Hills (1942) - Laurie Bishop
 Shoot to Kill (1947) - Marian Langdon
 Bells of San Angelo (1947) - Lodge Clerk (uncredited)
 Arthur Takes Over (1948) - Newspaper Woman
 Superman (1948, Serial) - Lara (uncredited)
 Mighty Joe Young (1949) - Nightclub Patron (uncredited)
 Girls in Prison (1956) - Cellblock Guard
 The She-Creature (1956) - Party Guest (final film role)

References

Sources
 The Helena Independent, Harrison In Hollywood, December 23, 1938, Page 11.
Ironwood, Michigan Daily Globe, In Hollywood, December 8, 1936, Page 6.
Mansfield, Ohio News Journal, Theaters, June 29, 1942, Page 13.
Wisconsin Rapids Daily Tribune, At The Theaters, March 3, 1938, Page 13.

External links

Luana Walters, at Rotten Tomatoes
Some videos available for Luana Walters, on-line, via IMDb

American film actresses
Western (genre) film actresses
Actresses from Los Angeles
1912 births
1963 deaths
Alcohol-related deaths in California
Deaths from liver disease
20th-century American actresses